HD 74438 is a spectroscopic quadruple stellar system composed of a pair of double star systems approximately 425 light years from Earth, located in open cluster IC 2391. With an estimated age of  million years, HD 74438 is the youngest quadruple star system known. The outer orbital period of the system, estimated at around 5.7 years, is also among the shortest of quadruple systems.

The HD 74438 system was confirmed to be a gravitationally bound quadruple system in 2017 from data collected in the Gaia-ESO Survey. In a paper published in 2022, HD 74438 was identified as a possible progenitor of a sub-Chandrasekhar Type Ia supernova.

References

A-type main-sequence stars
074438
Vela (constellation)
G-type main-sequence stars
4